Mississippi Highway 334 (MS 334) is a  west–east state highway in the North Central Hills region of northern Mississippi, connecting Oxford, through Toccopola, to MS 9 in Springville.

Route description

MS 334 begins in Lafayette County at the interchange between MS 314 (University Avenue) and MS 7 on the east side of downtown. It heads east along University Avenue for a few blocks before turning right and heading south at a signalized intersection. The highway has an interchange with US 278/MS 6 before passing through some neighborhoods and leaving Oxford shortly thereafter. MS 334 winds its way across some wooded hills for a few miles before lowering down into the Yocona River valley, following the river eastward along its northern banks. The highway passes through the communities of Yocona and Cornish (where it has an intersection with MS 331) before entering Pontotoc County.

MS 334 immediately passes through the town of Toccopola before leaving the Yocona River and heading east through mostly woodlands for the next several miles (passing by Camp Yocona) before coming to an end at an intersection with MS 9 in the community of Springville.

The entire length of Mississippi Highway 334, excluding around the interchanges with both MS 7 and US 278/MS 6 in Oxford, is a two-lane highway.

History
The entire route of MS 334 represents the original alignment of MS 6 between Oxford and Pontotoc.

Major intersections

References

External links

334
Transportation in Lafayette County, Mississippi
Transportation in Pontotoc County, Mississippi